George Arnold Escher (10 May 1843 – 14 June 1939) was a Dutch civil engineer and a foreign advisor to the Japanese government during the Meiji period.

He was the father of the graphic artist M. C. Escher and the geologist Berend George Escher.

Career
Escher was hired by the Japanese government as a foreign advisor from September 1873 to July 1878, along with fellow Dutch civil engineers Johannis de Rijke and Cornelis Johannes van Doorn. During his stay in Japan, he designed and supervised the restoration of the Yodo river (Osaka), and built a harbour in Mikuni in Fukui prefecture.

After returning to the Netherlands, he worked in Maastricht. During this time, he recorded in his diary his difficulty as a Protestant in finding a suitable marriage partner in Roman Catholic Maastricht who would also be able to satisfy his equation v = 1/2m + 10, where v was the age of the woman, and m the age of the husband.  In 1882, Escher married Charlotte Marie Hartitzsch, with whom he had two sons.  He became a widower in 1885, and in 1892 married Sara Gleichman, with whom he had three more sons. Escher worked as a hydraulic engineer in Leeuwarden. In 1903 the family moved to Arnhem.

Notes

References
 Kamibayashi, Yoshiyuki.   "Two Dutch Engineers and Improvements of Public Works in Japan,"  Proceedings of the Third International Congress on Construction History, Cottbus, May 2009.
 Louman, Johannes Petrus Antonius. (2007).  Fries waterstaatsbestuur: : een geschiedenis van de waterbeheersing in Friesland vanaf het midden van de achttiende eeuw tot omstreeks 1970. Amsterdam: Amsterdam University Press.  OCLC 150391614

External links
 
  御雇オランダ人工師エッセルの「阪井港修築建議」の現代文訳

Further reading

1843 births
1939 deaths
Dutch civil engineers
Foreign advisors to the government in Meiji-period Japan
Dutch expatriates in Japan
People from Leeuwarden